"Over the Rainbow" is a song from the musical film The Wizard of Oz (1939).

Over the Rainbow or Somewhere Over the Rainbow may also refer to:

Music 
 Over the Rainbow (band), a rock tribute band formed in 2008 by former members of Rainbow
 "Somewhere Over the Rainbow"/"What a Wonderful World", a 1993 medley by Israel Kamakawiwo'ole
 "Over the Rainbow", a song by Todrick Hall from Straight Outta Oz

Albums
 Over the Rainbow (2007 charity album)
 Over the Rainbow (Angela Chang album), 2004
Over the Rainbow (Benny Carter album), 1988
 Over the Rainbow (Mai Kuraki album), 2012
 Over the Rainbow (New York Unit album), 1992
 Over the Rainbow (Rainbow album), 2012
 Over the Rainbow (Jo Stafford album), 2004
 Over the Rainbow (Connie Talbot album), 2007
 Over the Rainbow (Livingston Taylor album), 1973
 Over the Rainbow (A Compilation of Rarities 1981–1983), an album by the Virgin Prunes
 Over the Rainbow (Nocera album), 1987
 Over the Rainbow – The Songbird Collection, a 2005 compilation album of female singer/songwriters
 Somewhere Over the Rainbow (Willie Nelson album), 1981
 Somewhere Over the Rainbow (Harold Mabern album), 2006
 Over The Rainbow (The Last Concert, Live!) a 1975 album, by various artists, recorded at the Rainbow Theatre in London

Television
 Over the Rainbow (1979 TV series), a TVB television series
 Over the Rainbow (2006 TV series), a South Korean television series
 Over the Rainbow (2010 TV series), a UK television series
 Over the Rainbow (Canadian TV series), a Canadian television series based on the 2010 UK series
 "Over the Rainbow" (Angel), 2001
 "Somewhere Over the Rainbow Bridge", a Hercules: The Legendary Journeys episode

Other uses 
 Over the Rainbow (organization), a non-profit organization based in Hong Kong serving the families of lesbians and gays
 Over the Rainbow (film), a 2002 South Korean film
 Over the Rainbow, a 1997 French film directed by Alexandre Aja
 Over the Rainbow (novel), a 2012 novel by Paul Pickering